The 6th Asian Winter Games were held in Changchun, Jilin, China from January 28 to February 4, 2007. The Winter Games are a celebration of Winter sports in Asia. This was the second time that China hosted the Asian Winter Games; the first was in Harbin, Heilongjiang in 1996.

Preparation
Preparation for the games began four years before the event. In the months leading up to the games the preparation was led by the Acting Governor of Jilin, Han Changbin.

Mascot

The 2007 Winter Asiad mascot was Lulu, a deer seen around Changchun commonly. It is a species of the sika deer, a native of East Asia. In the Chinese culture, this deer is considered to be a symbol of good luck and fortune. It is said to be featuring a mild temper, a sporty spirit and quick response. Lulu was expected to represent the welcoming smile of the Changchunans.

Emblem
Combining the movements of a ski jumper and a short-track speed skater, the emblem of the 2007 Asian Winter Games consisted of two Chinese calligraphy strokes. The blue C-shaped stroke called to mind the first letter of Changchun and represented the city's characteristic as the "city of ice and snow" and "city of science and technology". The bottom green stroke symbolized peace ("friendship first, competition second") and represented the city's characteristic as the "city of everlasting spring" and "city of the forest". The emblem presented an image of "change with each passing day" and "the hawk takes to the vast sky."

Sports
A total of 47 medal events in ten sports and disciplines were in contention in the Sixth Winter Asian Games.

Participating nations
The sixth edition marked the first time that all members of the Olympic Council of Asia sent delegations to the Winter Asiad. The following are the 25 National Olympic Committees which competed, with the number of competitors they fielded:

Seven figure skaters from Kuwait, Malaysia, Macau and a speed skater from Turkmenistan were not allowed to compete as their respective nations were not members of the International Skating Union. However, competitors were later allowed to compete, but their results were not allowed to count towards the official rankings.

Non-competing nations
The following only sent non-competing delegations:

Venues
There were six main venues for 47 contested events:
Beida Lake Skiing Resort - Alpine skiing, biathlon, freestyle skiing, snowboarding
Changchun Wuhuan Gymnasium - Opening ceremonies, closing ceremonies, figure skating, short-track speed skating
Changchun Municipal Skating Rink - Curling
Fu'ao Ice Skating Rink - Ice hockey (men's)
Jilin Province Skating Gymnasium - Ice hockey (women's)
Jilin Province Speed Skating Gymnasium - Speed skating

Calendar

Medal table

Controversies
 At the women's 3000-meter short-track speed skating relay award ceremony on January 31, the runner-up South Korean athletes played the slogan "Changbai Mountain is Korean territory." The next day, the OCA issued a serious warning to the South Korean delegation. The head of the Asian Department of the Chinese Ministry of Foreign Affairs met with officials of the South Korean Embassy in China to negotiate the matter. Then the officials of the South Korean delegation apologized to China.

References

External links
 Official website (Archived)

 
2007 in multi-sport events
2007 in winter sports
2007
2007 in Chinese sport
Sport in Changchun
Anti-South Korean sentiment in China
International sports competitions hosted by China
Multi-sport events in China
January 2007 sports events in Asia
February 2007 sports events in Asia